John Turner was an English footballer. His regular position was at full back. He played for Manchester United and Gravesend United.

External links
MUFCInfo.com profile

English footballers
Manchester United F.C. players
Year of death missing
Year of birth missing
Association football wing halves